Club Deportivo Mairena is a Spanish football team based in Mairena del Alcor, in the autonomous community of Andalusia. Founded in 1922, it plays in Tercera División – Group 10, holding home games at Estadio Nuevo San Bartolomé, with a capacity of 6,000 seats.

Season to season

19 seasons in Tercera División

Former players
 Sergio León
 Joaquín Rodríguez
 Rubén Jurado

External links
Official website 
Futbolme team profile 

Football clubs in Andalusia
Association football clubs established in 1922
1922 establishments in Spain